Chalab-e Qatakeh Bares (also Romanized as Chālāb-e Qatakeh Bāres) is a village in Qalkhani Rural District, Gahvareh District, Dalahu County, Kermanshah Province, Iran. At the 2006 census, its population was 34, in 6 families.

References 

Populated places in Dalahu County